Justin Brett Busby (born April 12, 1973) is a  current Justice of the Supreme Court of Texas and a former justice of the 14th Court of Appeals of Texas whose six-year term ended December 31, 2018. Along with many other Republican incumbents on the State's largest intermediate appellate courts, Busby was narrowly defeated in the November 2018 Democratic sweep.

On February 21, 2019, Texas Governor Greg Abbott nominated Busby to a vacancy on the Texas Supreme Court resulting from Justice Phil Johnson's retirement. Busby was unanimously confirmed by the Texas Senate on March 20 and sworn into office that same day.

Biography 

Busby received a Bachelor of Arts degree in public policy and international affairs from Duke University and his Juris Doctor from Columbia Law School.

Before entering private practice, Busby served as a law clerk to Judge Gerald Bard Tjoflat of the United States Court of Appeals for the Eleventh Circuit, to retired Associate Justice Byron White of the Supreme Court of the United States, and to Associate Justice John Paul Stevens.

State court service 

Before his appointment to the SCOTX in 2019, Busby served as a justice of the nine-member Fourteenth Court of Appeals in Houston from 2012 through December 31, 2018. The First and Fourteenth Court of Appeals are both housed in the 1910 Harris County Courthouse and divide the caseload of appeals from the ten  surrounding counties, including Harris County, the State's most populous one. They hear both civil and criminal matters and each issue about 1,100 per year. Busby appreciated the variety of the caseload: “There are very few generalists left in the law these days, but appellate judges are some of them. I really do enjoy that.”

The Houston Courts of Appeals function as a stepping stone for service on the Texas Supreme Court. Supreme Court Justice Eva Guzman, like Busby, previously served as a member of the Fourteenth Court of Appeals. The Court's newest member, Jane Bland, comes to the SCOTX from the First Court of Appeals, with a very brief interlude as an appellate lawyer in private practice with Vinson & Elkins. Her predecessor, Jeff Brown, also hails from Houston, and had previously served on a Harris County district court bench, as did Bland and Guzman. Democratic challengers in Texas Supreme Court races typically also hail from Harris County.

Busby ran for re-election in 2018, but was narrowly defeated by his Democratic opponent, Jerry Zimmerer.  All of the his Republican colleagues who were seeking re-election in Houston that year were also defeated.

“It’s certainly a dream job for me,” Busby is reported as commenting on his appointment, since the Supreme Court had been “grading my papers” during his six years as a state appellate judge. “It’s very exciting to be able to join them.” Busby and Bland now have an opportunity to double-check the work of the new arrivals on the Houston Court of Appeals, though not in cases that were before them in 2018, from which they will have to stand recused.

Busby is Board Certified in Civil Appellate Law by the Texas Board of Legal Specialization and served as Chair of the Appellate Section of the State Bar of Texas.

See also 
 List of law clerks of the Supreme Court of the United States (Seat 4)
 List of law clerks of the Supreme Court of the United States (Seat 6)

References

External links 
 Appearances at the U.S. Supreme Court from the Oyez Project
 

|-

1973 births
Living people
21st-century American lawyers
21st-century American judges
Columbia Law School alumni
Sanford School of Public Policy alumni
Federalist Society members
Law clerks of the Supreme Court of the United States
Texas lawyers
Texas Republicans
Texas state court judges
Justices of the Texas Supreme Court